Thaisa de Moraes Rosa Moreno (born 17 December 1988), commonly known as Thaisa or Isa Moreno, is a Brazilian footballer who plays as a midfielder for Flamengo and the Brazil women's national team. She previously played for Real Madrid, while her earlier career saw Thaisa play a short spell with Swedish Damallsvenskan club Tyresö FF in 2014 and with Sky Blue FC of the National Women's Soccer League in 2018.

Club career

Thaisa transferred from Ferroviária to Tyresö FF in January 2014, as one of four Brazilians to join the Swedish club.

Thaisa was a late substitute in Tyresö's 4–3 2014 UEFA Women's Champions League Final defeat by Wolfsburg. Shortly afterwards Tyresö were declared insolvent and kicked out of the 2014 Damallsvenskan season, expunging all their results and making all their players free agents.

On 13 December 2017, she signed with Sky Blue FC in the NWSL. After making eight appearances with the club she was released on 25 July 2018, so she could pursue overseas opportunities.

Switched to newly formed A.C. Milan Women in the Seria A for the 2018–19 season. On 26 July 2019, Thaisa joined CD Tacón in the Spanish Primera División. After two years of playing in Madrid, Thaisa returned to Italian football and signed for Roma on the summer of 2021.

International career
Thaisa made her senior debut for Brazil in September 2013, in a 1–0 defeat by New Zealand in Châtel-Saint-Denis, Switzerland. She scored her first national team goal in Brazil's 2–0 win over Chile at the 2013 Torneio Internacional de Brasília de Futebol Feminino.

International goals

Honours

Individual
Serie A Goal of the Year: 2019

Notes

References

External links

 FIU player profile
 

1988 births
Living people
Brazilian women's footballers
Brazil women's international footballers
Brazilian expatriate sportspeople in the United States
Tyresö FF players
Footballers at the 2016 Summer Olympics
2015 FIFA Women's World Cup players
Sportspeople from Paraná (state)
Women's association football midfielders
Associação Ferroviária de Esportes (women) players
Footballers at the 2015 Pan American Games
Feather River College alumni
FIU Panthers women's soccer players
Olympic footballers of Brazil
National Women's Soccer League players
NJ/NY Gotham FC players
Grindavík women's football players
A.C. Milan Women players
Clube de Regatas do Flamengo (women) players
Expatriate women's footballers in Italy
Expatriate women's footballers in Spain
Brazilian expatriate women's footballers
Brazilian expatriate sportspeople in Italy
Brazilian expatriate sportspeople in Spain
Serie A (women's football) players
2019 FIFA Women's World Cup players
Real Madrid Femenino players
A.S. Roma (women) players
Damallsvenskan players
Pan American Games medalists in football
Pan American Games gold medalists for Brazil
Medalists at the 2015 Pan American Games
Brazilian expatriate sportspeople in Iceland
Brazilian expatriate sportspeople in Sweden
Expatriate women's footballers in Iceland
Expatriate women's footballers in Sweden